Vaudeville Smash are an Australian funk band from Coburg, Victoria who formed in 2009. The band consists of Marc Lucchesi, Dan Lucchesi, Luca Lucchesi, Martin Lubran and James Bowers.

The group rose to international attention after they collaborated with sports commentator Les Murray for a tribute song honouring the French football player Zinedine Zidane. The song was named by Billboard as one of ten unofficial World Cup 2014 anthems.

Band members
Current members
 Marc Lucchesi – Vocals, Sax, Flute
 Dan Lucchesi – Drums, Vocals
 Luca Lucchesi – Bass Guitar, Vocals
 Martin Lubran – Guitar
 James Bowers – Keyboards

Discography

Studio albums

Extended plays

Singles

References

External links
 
 

2009 establishments in Australia
Australian funk musical groups
Musical groups established in 2009
Musical groups from Melbourne
Musical quintets
Victoria (Australia) musical groups